The flag of Surrey is the blue and gold chequered flag of the traditional county of Surrey and is derived from the coat of arms of William de Warenne, 1st Earl of Surrey (heraldic blazon: Chequy Or and Azur).

The Surrey flag was officially registered as a "traditional design" by the Flag Institute on 11 September 2014 following research by Philip Tibbetts on behalf of the Association of British Counties, which showed that the county was linked to an emblem of antiquity. Prior to this date, the county had no official flag but the banner of the coat of arms of Surrey County Council was frequently used instead.

The Surrey flag is a representation of the arms originally used as a personal heraldic device by William de Warenne, first Earl of Surrey, in 1088 and has since enjoyed a long association with the county itself, as attested to in a 17th-century poem about the Battle of Agincourt. 

An early reference of the arms is found in the 13th-century Glover's Roll of Arms, where an account of the siege of Caerlaverock Castle (from 1300) describes the actions of John de Warenne, 6th Earl of Surrey and includes a reference to his banner of blue and gold cheques: "his banner with gold and azure, was nobly chequered”. The de Warenne family became extinct in the male line in 1347 but, importantly, there is evidence the design continued to be used by the men of the county, as found in a poem about the Battle of Agincourt in 1415 by Michael Drayton (written in 1627) which records the men of Surrey carrying a banner of gold and blue checks into battle in honour of their late earl,

"The men of Surrey, Checky Blew and gold, (Which for brave Warren their first Earle they wore".

The 'De Warenne Cheques' are also remembered in a map by John Speed of the county of Surrey dating from 1610 and they were then adopted in various civic heraldic devices during the 19th and 20th centuries, including an heraldic badge in 1981 for the Surrey Herald Extraordinary.

References 

Surrey
Surrey
Surrey